Endothenia quadrimaculana is a moth of the family Tortricidae. It is found from northern and central Europe to Siberia and south-eastern Russia, Mongolia and China. Subspecies nubilana is found in North America.

The wingspan is 18–22 mm.The ground colour of the forewings is light brown with small dark brown spots along the costal  edge, a square brown spot in the middle of the wing and an inward-curved brown cross-band at the tip. The hindwings are light brown. Dissection of the genitalia is necessary to determine Endothenia species with certainty.

In France and Switzerland, there are two generations per year. Adults are on wing in May and June and again in August and September.

The larvae feed on Mentha spicata, Mentha arvensis, Lamium album, Stachys palustris, Stachys arvensis, Stachys recta and Symphytum officinale. In France also on Stachys affinis, which is imported from Japan. The larvae attack and damage the rhizomes of Stachys species, which will spoil easily and have to be eliminated before being sold. Only the larvae of the second generation cause economically important damage to cultivated Stachys, those of the early generation tunnel in the roots and the runners.

Subspecies
Endothenia quadrimaculana quadrimaculana (Eurasia)
Endothenia quadrimaculana nubilana (North America)

External links
Eurasian Tortricidae
UKmoths

Endotheniini
Moths described in 1963
Moths of Japan
Moths of Europe
Moths of Asia